Patrick Craven Green (born April 5, 1972) is an American Texas Country artist. Active since 1995, he has recorded a total of seven studio albums, including several independent works, three for Republic Records and two for BNA. Fifteen of his singles have charted on the Billboard Hot Country Songs charts, of which the highest-peaking is the No. 3 "Wave on Wave" from his gold-certified album of the same name.

Music career

Green started his music career as an 18-year-old at Texas Tech playing small gigs at bars and clubs around Lubbock.  In 1995, Green independently recorded and released a series of albums produced by Lloyd Maines using money borrowed from his parents. Green did not commit fully to his music career until 1997 when his stepfather fired him from his job as a fuel wholesaler.  Green had been counting his money from a weekend of singing and his stepfather knew he would need motivation to fully pursue music as a career.

After committing to music, Green drew the attention of Willie Nelson and joined a tour featuring Nelson and several other famous country musicians.  Green's appearance at the 1998 Willie Nelson July 4 Picnic was his first step towards nationwide recognition, and he was soon playing sold out shows in Texas.  Green was sponsored by Miller Lite and sold more than 250,000 albums, even without signing a major label recording contract.

Green's first major-label recorded album, Three Days, repackaged his best pre-major songs and new tracks with modern sound engineering. The album was released to acclaim in 2001. The adventurous, Beatles-influenced "Wave on Wave", was released in 2003, with the title track reaching number 3 on the charts by the end of the year. The album featured pop flourishes and sound engineering that was incrementally more compressed than that of "Three Days" but dramatically more so than that of his independent releases. The Christian-tinged title track remains Green's top career hit.

Green's mid-2000s period aimed to capitalize on his Wave on Wave commercial achievement. He achieved some critical and popular success but was unable to match his prior success and earned a "sellout" label. In late 2004, "Lucky Ones" was Green's 3rd and final CD release on the Universal/Republic label. Despite weak label support, the album peaked at number 6 on the U.S. Country charts. Green joined popular country music artists including Keith Urban, Gretchen Wilson, Dave Matthews Band, and Kenny Chesney on major tours. Green released his album Cannonball in 2006. CMT questioned the album as reaching for the "uninspired pop sound of today’s Nashville," with songs "starting to sound too much alike" and "crossing the line into Nashville pop" and perhaps not "honest and natural." Green acknowledged that he needed hits to sustain the career that he wanted. In 2008, Green released "Let Me", as the first single from what would become his final label-released album, What I'm For.  The single reached 12 on the country charts, giving Green his first Top 20 single since "Feels Just Like It Should" reached No. 13 in 2006. Initially, "Country Star" was released as the second single, but it was withdrawn shortly after the title track ("What I'm For") began receiving airplay.  "Country Star" peaked at 32, and "What I'm For" peaked at 28 on the country charts in July 2009.  Green parted ways with BNA shortly afterward.

Washing out of the industry in 2011, Green announced his return to Texas and independent music. On September 2, 2014, Taste of Country premiered the official lyric video for a new song, "Girls from Texas", featuring Lyle Lovett. On September 16, 2014, "Girls from Texas" was made available on iTunes. On May 18, 2015, Green released a new single, "While I Was Away." The video, a tribute to long-distance parents, premiered on People.com on May 22. "While I Was Away" was inducted into Taste of Country's Showdown Hall of Fame after winning five consecutive fan-voted rounds against artists including Blake Shelton, Dierks Bentley, Cassadee Pope, and David Nail.

Green's self-released Home debuted on digital media on August 14, 2015, and entered on the Top Country Albums chart at No. 5. The album includes appearances from Lyle Lovett, Sheryl Crow, and more. The twelfth single from the album, "Day One" was released to Texas radio on May 2, 2016. Green self-released the single "Drinkin' Days" on May 26, 2017. On Green's 46th birthday, April 5, 2018, Dancehall Dreamin': A Tribute to Pat Green was released. The album features covers of ten Pat Green hits along with commentary about each song. On July 20, 2018, he released the single "Friday's Comin'" worldwide.

On September 2, 2022, Green released his first album in seven years, "Miles and Miles of You," produced by Dwight A. Baker.

Personal life
Green was born in San Antonio to Craven Earl Green and Patricia Burgess.  He was raised in Waco, Texas, where he attended Vanguard College Preparatory School for grades 7–12.  Green's father was a former Air Force officer and stage actor who influenced his son's love of music.  His parents divorced when he was seven. His mother later remarried.

After high school, Green attended Texas Tech University where he was a member of FarmHouse fraternity.

Green is an ardent fan of Major League Baseball's Texas Rangers.  "I Like Texas," a song from his 1995 self-released album, Dancehall Dreamer, has been adopted as the Rangers' victory song.

Discography

Studio albums
 Three Days (2001) 
 Wave on Wave (2003) 
 Lucky Ones (2004) 
 Cannonball (2006) 
 What I'm For (2009)
 Home (2015)
 Miles and Miles of You (2022)

References

External links
Pat Green website
Pat Green Video- Acoustic Set- Interview

1972 births
20th-century American singers
21st-century American singers
American country guitarists
American country singer-songwriters
American male guitarists
American male singer-songwriters
BNA Records artists
Country musicians from Texas
Living people
Musicians from San Antonio
People from Waco, Texas
Republic Records artists
Singer-songwriters from Texas
Texas Tech University alumni
20th-century American guitarists
21st-century American guitarists
Guitarists from Texas
20th-century American male singers
21st-century American male singers